ircII (pronounced i-r-c-two or irk-two, and sometimes referred to as IRC client, second edition) is a free, open-source Unix IRC and ICB client written in C. Initially released in the late 1980s, it is the oldest IRC client still maintained.

History
Several other UNIX IRC clients, including  BitchX, EPIC, and ScrollZ, were originally forks of ircII. It was the first client to implement file transfer capabilities over IRC. The CTCP protocol was implemented by Michael Sandrof in 1990 for version 2.1. The DCC protocol was implemented by Troy Rollo in 1991 for version 2.1.2, and was never intended to be portable to other IRC clients.

Features
ircII is written in the C programming language and implements a termcap, text-mode, user interface. Encrypted Transport Layer Security connections to IRC servers are established with the OpenSSL library.
   The concept of file transfers over IRC networks was first implemented by the authors of ircII. The client was the first to implement both the Client-to-client protocol (CTCP) and the Direct Client-to-Client (DCC) protocol. The application has been promoted as being "fast, stable, lightweight, portable, and easily backgrounded."

See also 

Comparison of Internet Relay Chat clients
Internet Citizen's Band (ICB)
List of Internet Relay Chat commands

References

External links

 

Internet Relay Chat clients
Free Internet Relay Chat clients
Unix Internet Relay Chat clients